The 2010 NCAA Division I women's basketball tournament started Saturday, March 20, 2010 and was completed on Tuesday, April 6 of the same year  with University of Connecticut Huskies defending their title from the previous year by defeating Stanford, 53–47.

Tournament procedure

	
Pending any changes to the format, a total of 64 teams will enter the 2010 tournament. 32 automatic bids shall be awarded to each program that wins their conference's tournament. The remaining 36 bids are "at-large", with selections extended by the NCAA Selection Committee. The tournament is split into four regional tournaments, and each regional has teams seeded from 1 to 16, with the committee ostensibly making every region as comparable to the others as possible. The top-seeded team in each region plays the #16 team, the #2 team plays the #15, etc. (meaning where the two seeds add up to 17, that team will be assigned to play another).

The basis for the subregionals returned to the approach used between 1982 and 2002; the top sixteen teams, as chosen in the bracket selection process, hosted the first two rounds on campus.

The Selection Committee will also seed the entire field from 1 to 64.

Notable events
The top seeded Tennessee Lady Vols faced the Baylor Lady Bears in the Memphis Regional semifinals. This was a rematch of the season open for the two teams, a game won by Tennessee 74–65. Earlier in March, the freshman center for Baylor, Brittney Griner had broken the nose of Jordan Barncastle in a game against Texas Tech, which resulted in Griner playing more tentative, concerned about drawing attention to the referees. She was not tentative in the game against the Lady Vols, scoring 27 points and recording ten blocks. Despite her performance, Tennessee led by five points with under eight minutes to go in the game. Baylor then went on a 21–1 run to take a 15-point lead, and command of the game. Baylor won 77–62 to advance to the regional finals.

Stanford more than doubled up Georgia, winning 73–36 in the regional semifinal, then faced Xavier. Although Stanford opened up an early five-point lead, Xavier cut the lead to one. The Cardinal extended the lead to five again, and the Musketeers cut the lead to two points at the half. Stanford opened up a six-point lead in the second half, but Xavier responded to take a lead. With just under a minute to go, Xavier took a two-point lead  and Kayla Pedersen hit a jumper to tie the game at 53 points apiece. With 18 seconds left, Xavier ran a play that opened up Delaquese Jernigan under the basket. She received the ball, and missed a point-blank uncontested layup. The rebound came out beyond the three-point line to Amber Harris. The Cardinal were trying to cover the Xavier players, but missed Jernigan standing by herself under the basket. Harris passed the ball in to Jernigan who took an uncontested layup and missed it again. With only four seconds left in the game Jeanette Pohlen drove the length of the court, weaving among defenders, and threw up a shot with under a second left. The shot went in and the Cardinal won 55–53 to advance.

In the Kansas City Regional, both top seeds were upset in the semifinal round. Kentucky, led by 21 point from A'dia Mathies, opened up a lead ant he second half, extended it to 19 points, and were victorious, beating Nebraska 76–67 to advance to the regional finals. The regional semifinal game was a second of the season for Oklahoma and Notre Dame, a game the Irish has won in the regular season. In this game the score was tied early, while Oklahoma took a slim lead at the half. They extended the lead to eight points in the second half, but Notre Dame took the lead back at 50–49. With less than a minute to play, Oklahoma took a three-point lead, but Skyler Diggins hit a three-pointer to tie the game at 66 points each. Oklahoma had the ball for the last possession, but never got a shot off, so the game went to overtime. The game was tied with 72 points for each team with seconds to go when Oklahoma had another chance. This time, Nyeshia Stevenson hit a three-pointer, giving the Sooners a three-point lead with just over four seconds to go. Notre Dame tried a long inbounds pass, but were unsuccessful, and Oklahoma won 77–72.

In the Dayton Regional, Connecticut prevailed easily. They held their first three opponents to under 40 points each. While Florida State, in the regional final, managed to 50, the Huskies scored 90. This set up a game against Baylor in a semifinal game. The Baylor Bears would not go so easily. The Huskies seemed to be on the same track as prior games, with a 13-point lead at halftime. Kalana Greene scored the first basket of the second half, extending the lead to 15 points. However, Baylor then scored the next twelve points, cutting the lead to three. Connecticut, which had missed eight consecutive shots, began hitting again, and their defense held Baylor without a field goal for over seven minutes. UConn scored 16 points during the stretch and rebuild the lead. UConn would go on to win the game 70–50, to reach the championship game.

After the close call against Xavier, the Cardinal seemed in control in their game against Oklahoma in the second half when they led by 18 points. However, the Sooners, concentrated on defense, and cut the lead to three points with only 16 seconds left in the game. On the inbounds play, Oklahoma failed to guard Nnemkadi Ogwumike, and Kayla Pedersen made a long pass to an open Ogwumike who made an open layup to extend the lead to five points. Then Stanford stole the ball, was fouled, and hit the final two free throws to complete the victory 73–66. Ogwumike scored 38 points, including the final seven of the game for Stanford.

Stanford entered the national championship game on a 27-game winning streak. The last game they had lost, occurred in December 2009. It was against Connecticut. The UConn team entered the national championship game on a 77 winning streak. The last game they had lost, occurred in April 2008. It was against Stanford.

UConn was no stranger to low scoring halves in an NCAA game. There had been, up to this point, eleven halves of basketball in NCAA tournament history with twelve or fewer points. UConn was involved in four of them. On three occasions, involving Southern University in 2010, Long Island University in 2001, and Temple in 2010, the Huskies held their opponents to twelve or fewer points. However, on this day, Connecticut would be on the opposite side of the ledger, scoring only 12 points against Stanford in the first half. The first two minutes gave no indication of this result. UConn held a 5–0 lead just over two minutes into the game, but they would not score again until after the media timeout with under eight minutes to go in the half. Connecticut hit but 5 of their 29 shot attempts in the first half for a shooting percentage of 17% described by the New York Times as "laughable". However, their inability to hit a basket did not prevent them from playing defense, and they held the Cardinal to 8 baskets on 31 shots, a percentage the Times called "abysmal". Stanford ended the half with an 8-point lead.

The second half proved to be very different. UConn scored 17 of the first 19 points in the half and took a lead. They held Ogwumike, who had scored 38 points in the semifinal, to eleven points. They held Jayne Appel, one of the nation's leading centers, to zero points on 0–12 shooting. Appel was playing on a sore ankle that required pain killers during the game. Maya Moore scored 23 points for UConn and Tina Charles contributed eleven rebounds. In the end, Connecticut won 53–47 to win their seventh national championship and complete the first back-to-back undefeated seasons in NCAA history.

2010 NCAA Tournament schedule and venues

First and Second rounds (Subregionals)

The format is the same as the Men's Tournament, except that there are 64 teams and no play-in game. There are 31 automatic bids for conference champions and 33 at-large bids available.
The subregionals, based on the "pod system" keeping teams at or close to home, will be at these locations from March 21 through 24. Prior to the committee's decision to expand the number of subregional sites to sixteen, eight sites were chosen. This list included the Sun National Bank Center in Trenton, New Jersey. When the decision was made to increase the number of sites to sixteen, Trenton declined to participate.

The remaining seven sites continue to be part of the final list of sixteen:
Frank Erwin Center, University of Texas at Austin, Austin, Texas (Sunday, Tuesday)
Haas Pavilion, University of California, Berkeley, Berkeley, California (Saturday, Monday)
Thompson–Boling Arena, University of Tennessee, Knoxville, Tennessee (Saturday, Monday)
Williams Arena, University of Minnesota, Twin Cities, Minneapolis (Sunday, Tuesday)
Ted Constant Convocation Center, Old Dominion University, Norfolk, Virginia (Sunday, Tuesday)
Edmund P. Joyce Center, University of Notre Dame, South Bend, Indiana (Sunday, Tuesday)
Wells Fargo Arena, Arizona State University, Tempe, Arizona (Saturday, Monday)

As per the expansion of the subregional sites, these nine sites were added in 2008:
Freedom Hall, Louisville, Kentucky (Host: University of Louisville) (Saturday, Monday)
The Pit, University of New Mexico, Albuquerque, New Mexico
Cameron Indoor Stadium, Duke University, Durham, North Carolina (Saturday, Monday)
Lloyd Noble Center, University of Oklahoma, Norman, Oklahoma (Sunday, Tuesday)
Bank of America Arena at Hec Edmundson Pavilion, University of Washington, Seattle, Washington (Saturday, Monday)
Petersen Events Center, University of Pittsburgh, Pittsburgh (Sunday, Tuesday)
Cintas Center, Xavier University, Cincinnati (Sunday, Tuesday)
Donald L. Tucker Center, Tallahassee, Florida (Host: Florida State University) (Saturday, Monday)
Hilton Coliseum, Iowa State University, Ames, Iowa (Sunday, Tuesday)

That list included Albuquerque, but Albuquerque had to withdraw, due to construction issues. The NCAA added Stanford, as a replacement:
Maples Pavilion, Stanford University, Palo Alto, California (Saturday, Monday)

Note: Unless otherwise indicated, all locations are on-campus sites.

Sweet Sixteen and Elite Eight (Regional semifinals and finals)

The Regionals, named for the city rather than the region of geographic importance since 2005, which will be held from March 28 to 31, will be at these sites:

Dayton Regional, University of Dayton Arena, Dayton, Ohio.
Kansas City Regional, Sprint Center, Kansas City, Missouri (Host: Big 12 Conference).
Memphis Regional, FedExForum, Memphis, Tennessee (Host: University of Memphis).
Sacramento Regional, ARCO Arena, Sacramento, California (Host: University of the Pacific).

National semifinals and championship (Final Four and championship)
April 4 and 6
Alamodome, San Antonio, Texas (Hosts: the Incarnate Word, the UTSA, and San Antonio Sports)

This is the second time the women's Final Four will be played in San Antonio, having previously been played in the city in 2002.

Tournament records
 Points in a Final Four game—Nnemkadi Ogwumike scored 38 points, the second most ever in an NCAA Final Four game in the National semifinal between Stanford and Oklahoma
 Free throws—Nnemkadi Ogwumike, Stanford, hit 12 free throws in the semifinal against Oklahoma, tied for the most free throws completed in a semifinal game.
 Free throws—Stanford attempted four three throws in a game against Connecticut, the fewest free throws attempted in an NCAA Tournament game. 
 Blocked shots—Brittney Griner, Baylor, blocked 14 shots in the second-round game against Georgetown, the most blocked shots recorded in an NCAA Tournament game since blocks began being recorded in 1988. 
 Free throws—Iowa State completed zero throws in a game against Connecticut, tied for the fewest free throws completed in an NCAA Tournament game.
 Blocked shots—Baylor blocked 16 shots in the second-round game against Georgetown, the most blocked shots recorded in an NCAA Tournament game. 
 Three-pointers—Maya Moore hit 20 three-point field goals, tied for the most three-point shots completed in an NCAA Tournament.
 Blocked shots—Brittney Griner, Baylor, blocked 40 shots, the most blocked shots recorded in an NCAA Tournament since blocks began being recorded in 1988. 
 Three-pointers—Connecticut hit 47 three-point field goals, tied for the most three-point shots completed in an NCAA Tournament.

Qualifying teams – automatic

Sixty-four teams were selected to participate in the 2010 NCAA Tournament. Thirty-one conferences were eligible for an automatic bid to the 2010 NCAA tournament.

Qualifying teams – at-large
Thirty-three additional teams were selected to complete the sixty-four invitations.

Bids by conference
Thirty-one conferences earned an automatic bid. In nineteen cases, the automatic bid was the only representative from the conference. Thirty-three additional at-large teams were selected from twelve of the conferences.

Tournament seeds

Bids by state

The sixty-four teams came from twenty-eight states, plus Washington, D.C. Tennessee had the most teams with six bids. Twenty-two states did not have any teams receiving bids.

Game summaries

Dayton region

First round
Sixth seeded St. John's took on the eleventh seeded Ivy League champion Princeton. The Tigers had won their last 21 games, the nation's third longest win streak. While Princeton stayed close early, only down 15–12 at one time, they missed 15 of their next sixteen shots while St. John's pulled out to a sixteen-point halftime lead. The two teams played roughly evenly the second half, but the halftime lead was more than enough and the Red Storm prevailed 65–47.

Fourteenth seeded Louisiana Tech (La Tech) was returning to the NCAA Tournament after a three-year absence. Under Maggie Dixon award winning new coach Teresa Weatherspoon, the Lady Techsters took on third seeded Florida State. La tech started out strong, pulling out to a nine-point lead late in the first half, but the Seminoles fought back to a 40–40 tie at halftime. The score was close well into the second half, with Florida State holding onto a one-point lead with just under nine minutes to go, but the Seminoles gradually increased the lead to ten. Although the Lady Techsters cut the lead in half to 65–61 with just under two minutes left, they would not score again and Florida State would hit ten straight free throws in the closing minutes to win 75–61.

Second round

Kansas City region

First round
Michigan State's fifth year senior Aisha Jefferson had stomach problems from a pre-game meal severe enough to keep her hunched over the front of a trash can in the first half, but it wasn't enough to keep her out of the game. She scored 17 points along with nine rebounds to help lead the fifth seeded Spartans over 12 seed Bowling Green 72–62.

Thirteenth seeded Liberty tried to challenge fourth seeded Kentucky, scoring the first six points, and leading by as much as nine early, but Kentucky's freshman A'dia Mathies, scored 32 points to set a personal career high and an NCAA tournament record for Kentucky to help the Wildcats retake the lead. The Liberty Flames fought back, and had a slim two-point lead at halftime, but the Kentucky team, behind 26 of 36 free-throws, pulled ahead to win 83–77.

Second round

Memphis region

First round
Seventh seeded LSU easily beat tenth seeded Hartford 60–39. This was  Hartford's first at-large invitation to the NCAA Tournament, but without leading scorer Erica Beverly, lost to a season-ending injury, the Hawks were unable to stay with the Tigers. LSU held Hartford scoreless for nearly eight minutes, scoring 17 consecutive points to take an early lead they would never give up.

Top seeded Tennessee defeated 16 seed Austin Peay  75–42. Playing at their home court "The Summitt", the Lady Vols scored 15 points before allowing a score by the Lady Govs.

Second-seeded Duke took on 15 seed Hampton in Cameron Indoor Stadium, the Blue Devils home court, where Duke had won twelve consecutive NCAA Tournament games. The Pirates managed to hold a slim lead in the early minutes of the game, but Duke quickly took over, moving out to a 40–14 halftime lead and winning easily 72–37.

Eighth seeded Dayton took on ninth seeded TCU in their first ever NCAA appearance. Early in the second half, it appeared that Dayton would only be playing one game, as they were behind by 18 points, 50–32. However, the Flyers did not fold, and hit a basket with one second left in the game to win by a single point 67–66.

Twelve seed Marist scored the first seven points in their game against five seed Georgetown, which may have reminded fans of the way Marist played in 2007, coming to the tournament as a 13 seed, and knocking off Ohio State and Middle Tennessee to make it to the round of sixteen. Georgetown, which hasn't been to the tournament in 17 years, started slowly, but managed to hold a two-point lead at halftime. Georgetown's Monica McNutt hit back-to-back three-pointers to start a 13–0 run at the beginning of the second half. The Red Foxes would never close the gap, and Georgetown went on to win 62–42.

Fourth seed Baylor took on 13th seed Fresno State. Baylor's Brittney Griner returned to the floor, after sitting out a two-game suspension for hitting an opponent in a game. This was freshman Griner's first tournament, and she confessed to having jitters, but she controlled the lane, and help keep Fresno State from winning their first ever NCAA game. Baylor held a six-point lead at halftime, which they stretched out to a 69–55 final score.

Sacramento region

First round
A fifteen seed has never beaten a two seed in the NCAA Women's Tournament, but with under five minutes left in the first half, 15th seeded Portland State was ahead of the second seed Texas A&M. The lead didn't last long, as the Aggies pulled to an eight-point lead at halftime, and extended the lead through the second half. Texas A&M's Tanisha Smith just missed a triple double, with nine assist to go along with 17 points and 10 rebounds. The final score favored the Aggies 84–53.

Normally, a four seed would be a large favorite against a 13 seed, but normally, the four seed isn't required to bench one of their players, and not just any player, but Andrea Riley, the third leading scorer in Division 1. Two years earlier, Riley had thrown  punch in an NCAA game, which earned her a one-game suspension. NCAA rules required that it be an NCAA game. Oklahoma State lost the game in which the punch was thrown, and did not make it to the Tournament in 2009, so the suspension was served two years later. The 13th seeded Chattanooga tried to take advantage of the situation, and led by as much as 18 in the first half. Riley could only cheer on the team from the bench. Freshman Toni Young responded by scoring 22 points, and senior Tegan Cunningham, after struggling in the first half, began hitting in the second half and ended up with 25 points, enough to help Oklahoma State win 70–63.

The 8/9 match-up between Iowa and Rutgers pitted current Rutgers coach C. Vivian Stringer against the program she helped bring to national prominence two decades earlier. Iowa had lost a game in the Big Ten tournament, after a big lead, and they didn't want to experience that again. Rutgers played even with the Hawkeyes, in the second half, but the seven point halftime lead stood up and Iowa won 70–63.

Seventh seed Gonzaga took on tenth seeded North Carolina. Gonzaga's Tiffanie Shives was scoreless for 31 minutes, but then scored 14 in the next five minutes. Her first basket cut the Tarheels lead to two, and her next basket gave Gonzaga a lead they would not relinquish, although North Carolina cut the lead to one with under four minutes to go, only to fall short 82–76.

Twelfth seed Tulane stayed with fifth seed Georgia for 32 minutes, in a game with five lead changes and four ties, but then the Bulldogs went on an 18–2 run to take the lead for good. Georgia's Ashley Houts would score 22 points for the winning team, and teammate Angel Robinson had a double-double (18 points, 13 rebounds) to help lead the Bulldogs over the Green Wave 64–59.

The last time Stanford was a number 1 seed, they became to only top seed in the men's or women's tournament to lose to a sixteen seed. Earlier in the day, the top seeded men's team, Kansas, lost to Northern Iowa, so no one felt safe in the opening match against UC Riverside. Stanford jumped out to an 8–0 lead, and behind Ogwumike's double-double (19 points, 11 rebounds) won easily over the Big West champion 79–47.

Second round

Brackets
Results to date (* indicates game went to overtime):

Dayton Regional – Dayton, Ohio

Memphis Regional – Memphis, Tennessee

Sacramento Regional – Sacramento, California

Kansas City Regional – Kansas City, Missouri

Final Four – San Antonio, Texas

Record by conference

Eighteen conferences went 0–1: the Atlantic Sun, Big Sky, Big South, Big West, Colonial, Conference USA, Ivy League, MAAC, MEAC, MAC, Missouri Valley, Northeast, Ohio Valley, Patriot, Southern, Southland, SWAC and Summit.

All-Tournament team

 Maya Moore, Connecticut
 Tina Charles, Connecticut
 Nnemkadi Ogwumike, Stanford
 Kayla Pedersen, Stanford
 Danielle Robinson, Oklahoma

Game officials

 Tina Napier(semifinal)
 Bryan Enterline (semifinal)
 Denise Brooks  (semifinal)
 Lisa Mattingly (semifinal)
 Michael Price (semifinal)
 Laura Morris (semifinal)
 Dee Kantner  (final)
 Eric Brewton (final)
 Lisa Jones (final)

Media coverage

Television
ESPN had US television rights to all games during the tournament. For the first and second round, ESPN aired select games nationally on ESPN or ESPNU. All other games were aired regionally on ESPN2 and streamed online via ESPN3. Most of the nation got whip-a-round coverage during this time, which allowed ESPN to rotate between the games and focus the nation on the one that was the closest. The regional semifinals were split between ESPN and ESPN2, and ESPN aired the regional finals, national semifinals, and championship match.

Studio host and analysts
Trey Wingo (Host)
Kara Lawson (Analyst)
Carolyn Peck (Analyst)

Commentary teams

First & Second Rounds Saturday/Monday
Beth Mowins & Stephanie Ready – Durham, North Carolina
Dave O'Brien & Doris Burke – Knoxville, Tennessee
Justin Kutcher & Rebecca Lobo – Louisville, Kentucky
Jon Sciambi & Abby Waner – Tallahassee, Florida
Terry Gannon & Mary Murphy – Stanford, California
Cara Capuano & Kayte Christensen – Berkeley, California
Allen Hopkins & Krista Blunk – Seattle, Washington
Dave Pasch & Brenda VanLengen – Tempe, Arizona
Sweet Sixteen & Elite Eight Saturday/Monday
Dave O'Brien, Doris Burke, & Holly Rowe – Memphis, Tennessee
Dave Pasch, Mary Murphy, & Cara Capuano – Sacramento, California
Final Four
Dave O'Brien, Doris Burke, Rebecca Lobo, & Holly Rowe – San Antonio, Texas

First & Second Rounds Sunday/Tuesday
Bob Picozzi & Jimmy Dykes – Ames, Iowa
Carter Blackburn & LaChina Robinson – Austin, Texas
Bob Wischusen & Stephanie White – Cincinnati, Ohio
Clay Matvick & Leslie Hill – Minneapolis, Minnesota
Marc Kestecher & Stephen Bardo – Norfolk, Virginia
Dan McLaughlin & Fran Fraschilla – Norman, Oklahoma
Eric Collins & Brooke Weisbrod – Notre Dame, Indiana
Pam Ward & Debbie Antonelli – Pittsburgh, Pennsylvania
Sweet Sixteen & Elite Eight Sunday/Tuesday
Bob Wischusen, Stephanie White, & Rebecca Lobo – Dayton, Ohio
Pam Ward, Debbie Antonelli, & Beth Mowins – Kansas City, Missouri
Championship
Dave O'Brien, Doris Burke, Rebecca Lobo, & Holly Rowe – San Antonio, Texas

See also
 2010 NCAA Division II women's basketball tournament
 2010 NCAA Division III women's basketball tournament
 2010 NAIA Division I women's basketball tournament
 2010 NAIA Division II women's basketball tournament
 2010 NCAA Division I men's basketball tournament

Notes

 
NCAA Division I women's basketball tournament
NCAA Division I women's basketball tournament
2010
Basketball competitions in Austin, Texas
Basketball competitions in San Antonio
NCAA Division I women's basketball tournament
Basketball competitions in Memphis, Tennessee